Manon Kriéger (born 25 September 1993) is a French badminton player. In 2015, she won the Morocco International tournament in the mixed doubles event partnered with Vincent Espen. In 2017, she and Espen reached the semifinals in the same tournament. She also reached the finals round in the women's singles event, but lost to Martina Repiska of Slovakia.

Achievements

BWF International Challenge/Series 
Women's singles

Women's doubles

Mixed doubles

  BWF International Challenge tournament
  BWF International Series tournament
  BWF Future Series tournament

References

External links 
 

1993 births
Living people
Sportspeople from Saint-Maur-des-Fossés
French female badminton players
21st-century French women